Sammu Nirwantha Thikshila de Silva, or commonly as Thikshila de Silva (born 16 December 1993) is a professional Sri Lankan cricketer. He is a past student of Devapathiraja College, Raggama, and Mahinda College, Galle.

Domestic career
He made his first-class debut for Chilaw Marians Cricket Club in the 2014–15 Premier Trophy on 20 February 2015.

In April 2018, he was named in Colombo's squad for the 2018 Super Provincial One Day Tournament. In August 2018, he was named in Kandy's squad the 2018 SLC T20 League. In October 2020, he was drafted by the Colombo Kings for the inaugural edition of the Lanka Premier League.

International career
In January 2017 he was named in Sri Lanka's Twenty20 International (T20I) squad for their series against South Africa. He made his T20I debut for Sri Lanka against South Africa on 20 January 2017. Later the same month he was named in Sri Lanka's One Day International (ODI) squad, also for their series against South Africa. However, he was dropped from the squad on the day before the first ODI match.

References

External links
 

1993 births
Living people
Sri Lankan cricketers
Sri Lanka Twenty20 International cricketers
Chilaw Marians Cricket Club cricketers
Puttalam District cricketers
Cricketers from Galle
Colombo Stars cricketers